Aaron was a Miaphysite Coptic saint. His apocryphal legend says of him, "When he was sick, he made roasted pigeons fly into his mouth." He has a feast in the Coptic Calendar of saints on May 16. There is no reference to this saint on this day in the Coptic Synaxarium, nor is "May" to be found on the Coptic calendar.

References

Sources
Holweck, F. G. A Biographical Dictionary of the Saint. St. Louis, MO: B. Herder Book Co. 1924.

Coptic Orthodox saints
Year of birth unknown
Year of death unknown